Diego Agustín Calgaro (born November 27, 1984 in Posadas) is an Argentine football midfielder currently playing for Crucero del Norte of the Argentine second division.

External links
 Guardian statistics
 Argentine Primera statistics
 Diego Calgaro – Transfer from Rosario Central to AS Trenčín

1984 births
Living people
People from Posadas, Misiones
AS Trenčín players
Expatriate footballers in Slovakia
Argentine expatriate sportspeople in Slovakia
Argentine Primera División players
Argentine expatriate footballers
Argentine footballers
Association football midfielders
Rosario Central footballers
Unión de Santa Fe footballers
Tiro Federal footballers
Atlético Tucumán footballers
Crucero del Norte footballers
Sportspeople from Misiones Province